Spondylus squamosus is a species of Spondylus, a genus of bivalve.

This species is found in the Northern Pacific Ocean, resting in tidal zone up to 20 m deep in the sea.  They attach themselves to the basis of the sea with their right valve.

References

Spondylidae
Bivalves described in 1793